Jalal Bazargan-Vali (born 23 December 1939) is an Iranian gymnast. He competed in seven events at the 1964 Summer Olympics.

References

External links
 

1939 births
Living people
Iranian male artistic gymnasts
Olympic gymnasts of Iran
Gymnasts at the 1964 Summer Olympics
Place of birth missing (living people)